The Curse of Chalion is a 2001 fantasy novel by American writer Lois McMaster Bujold. In 2002 it won the Mythopoeic Fantasy Award for Adult Literature and was nominated for the Hugo, World Fantasy, and Locus Fantasy Awards in 2002. The series that it began, World of the Five Gods, won the Hugo Award for Best Series in 2018.

Both The Curse of Chalion and its sequel Paladin of Souls (2003) are set in the fictional landlocked medieval kingdom of Chalion. The prequel The Hallowed Hunt (2005) takes place in the Weald to the south of Chalion and two to three hundred years earlier.

Plot summary 
Cazaril was formerly a noble in the land of Chalion, but was betrayed and sold into slavery. He returns to a regional court where he is hired as tutor to Iselle (second in line for the throne of Chalion after her brother Teidez) and her handmaid Betriz, for whom he develops romantic feelings. Their mother Ista also lives with them, but is considered mad.

He accompanies Teidez, Iselle and Betriz to the capital, where he encounters his betrayer Dondo, whose brother Martou is chancellor to the ailing monarch Orico. Orico spends much time in his menagerie, run by the exile Umegat. The corrupt Dondo spends time with Teidez, exposing the boy to various vices, and arranges a marriage to Iselle. In desperation, Cazaril calls on the Bastard (one of the five gods) for a miracle of death magic, accepting that if it succeeds in killing Dondo, his life will be claimed as well. Dondo dies, but Cazaril does not, finding himself gifted with second sight by the experience. With Umegat's help, he learns that the royal family of Chalion is under a generation-old curse, and that Orico is only sustained through the cleansing magic of the menagerie. He also finds that Dondo's soul and the Bastard's death demon are bound to his body in the form of a tumor, with the demon trying to bring about his death so it can return to the gods with the required two souls.

Acting on misinformation from Dondo, Teidez destroys the menagerie and severely injures Umegat, but a wound he sustains in the process becomes infected and proves fatal. Orico collapses, leaving Iselle soon to assume the throne, but her power is constrained by Martou, who spreads rumors that she is unstable like her mother. Cazaril informs Iselle of the curse, and his belief that since Ista married into the curse, Iselle could marry out of it. She dispatches him in secret to arrange her marriage to the heir of Ibra, a neighbouring country. He speaks to Ista on the way, and learns of a prophecy that the curse can be broken by a man "willing to lay down his life three times for the House of Chalion." Cazaril has done so once, but because of the demon, his next death must be final.

Arriving in Ibra, he finds that he had previously met the heir Bergon, taking a severe beating meant for the boy while they both were slaves. Informing Bergon of the curse, they convince Bergon's father to agree to the marriage. They return to Chalion, fighting through an ambush set by Martou. Iselle has also escaped from Martou, and she and Bergon are married. However, instead of freeing Iselle from the curse, it spreads to Bergon.

Martou and his men attack, trying to kill Bergon and recapture Iselle. Cazaril fights them off as long as he can, but is captured. Martou stabs him through the body, hitting Cazaril's tumor. The release of the demon takes with it the souls of Cazaril, Dondo, and Martou, and the Daughter (another of the five gods) saves Cazaril's soul, leaving the demon to carry off the others. With his soul expanded by accepting his third death (taking the beating for Bergon, invoking death magic for Iselle, and now fighting to hold off Martou), the Daughter uses Cazaril's soul as a window to reach into the physical world and cleanse the curse. She returns him to his body, invoking one last miracle to spare him from dying of fever from his wound.

Iselle is crowned to rule Chalion, with Bergon as her consort and their children to inherit both lands. Cazaril is made chancellor, and he and Betriz are happily married.

Allusions to actual history and geography

The Curse of Chalion and other books in the World of the Five Gods series are set in a world loosely based on southern Europe during the time of the Reconquista, or Spanish Reconquest. The states of Chalion, Ibra, and Brajar are fictional equivalents of Castile and León, Aragon, and Portugal, respectively. In Bujold's world, these states are in the south and are subject to invaders from the north, the Roknari, who correspond to the Muslims during the Reconquest.

Characters in The Curse of Chalion also have historical equivalents. Iselle of Chalion is based on Isabella I of Castile, Bergon of Ibra is based on Ferdinand II of Aragon, and their secret marriage reflects the secret betrothal of Isabella and Ferdinand. The character Teidez corresponds to Alfonso Prince of Asturias.

Reception 
The book has received a number of reviews. It was nominated for the 2002 Hugo Award for Best Novel. The World of the Five Gods series won the Hugo Award for Best Series in 2018.

References

External links 
 Publisher's page for ''The Curse of Chalion
 Bujold Nexus's Chalion index; includes link to map of Ibran Peninsula
 The Curse of Chalion at Worlds Without End

American fantasy novels
2001 American novels
Novels by Lois McMaster Bujold
High fantasy novels
HarperCollins books